James Richardson may refer to:

Politicians
James Armstrong Richardson (1922–2004), Canadian politician
James Burchill Richardson (1770–1836), Governor of South Carolina, 1802–1804
James D. Richardson (1843–1914), Democrat from Tennessee, U.S. House Minority Leader, 1899–1903
James M. Richardson (politician) (1858–1925), U.S. Representative from Kentucky
James Richardson (Liberal politician) (1846–1921), Liberal Member of Parliament for Armagh
James Richardson (political consultant) (born 1984), Republican political strategist

Sports
James Richardson (darts player) (born 1974), English darts player
James Richardson (footballer) (1885–1951), Scottish footballer for Huddersfield Town, Sheffield Wednesday, and Ayr United
Jimmy Richardson (1911–1964), English footballer
James Richardson Spensley (1867–1915), English doctor, footballer and manager, considered to be the father of football in Italy
James Richardson (sportsman) (1903–1995), English cricketer and rugby union player

Military
James M. Richardson (general) (born 1960), lieutenant general in the United States Army
James Cleland Richardson (1895–1916), Canadian recipient of the Victoria Cross
James L. Richardson, United States Army general
James O. Richardson (1878–1974), admiral in the United States Navy prior to World War II

Others
James Richardson (explorer) (1809–1851), British explorer of the Sahara
James Richardson (poet) (born 1950), American poet
James Richardson, owner of Spadina Hotel, Toronto
James Richardson (presenter) (born 1966), British television presenter associated with Italian football
James Richardson (1819–1892), Canadian businessman
James Richardson & Sons
Jim Richardson (born 1941), English jazz bassist and session musician
James Richardson Corporation, Australian corporation involved with furniture, hospitality, real estate, and the duty-free retail businesses
James Armstrong Richardson Sr. (1885–1939), Canadian businessman
James Joseph Richardson (born 1935), American man wrongly convicted of the murder of his children
James Smith Richardson (1883–1970), Scottish architect, antiquarian and archaeologist
James T. Richardson (born c. 1943), American sociologist who wrote extensively about new religious movements, popularly called cults